Instinct is the second and final full-length studio album by English trip hop duo Mandalay, released in 2000 through V2 Records. Two singles were released to help promote the album: "Deep Love" and "Not Seventeen".

Track listing

Personnel

Mandalay
Saul Freeman - Composition, guitar, bass, synthesizer, piano, sampler, programming
Nicola Hitchcock - Composition, lyrics, vocals, guitars

Additional musicians
Jon Hassell - trumpet
Nick Ignman, Isobel Griffiths  - string arrangement
Gavyn Wright - strings
Yoad Nevo - guitars, bass, additional keyboards, programming
Baz Mattie - drums

Production
Mandalay - Production
Guy Sigsworth - Production
Andy Bradfield - Additional Production & Mix
Michael Ade - Tape edits, recording, mixing
Russell Evora - Additional recording
Chris Scard - Additional recording
Ian Rossiter - Additional recording
Paul Stoney - Additional recording
Tom Jenkins - Additional recording
Simon Burwell - Additional recording
Tom Coyne - Mastering
Saul Freeman - Technician

Artwork
Chris Bigg - Art Direction, design
Jim Friedman - Photography
Blinkk - Photography
Chris Levine, Nick Allen - Artwork design, photography

References

External links

2000 albums
Mandalay (band) albums
V2 Records albums